Cicindela chinensis japonica, commonly known as the Japanese tiger beetle, is a subspecies of cicindela chinensis ground beetles native to Asia.

External links
This article incorporates information from the Norwegian Wikipedia.

japonica
Beetles described in 1781